This is a list of the squads of the teams that participated in the 2013 Caribbean Premier League.

Antigua Hawksbills

Justin Kemp (injured), Steven Smith (injured)

Barbados Tridents

Guyana Amazon Warriors

Jamaica Tallawahs

St Lucia Zouks

Trinidad and Tobago Red Steel

References

External links

Caribbean Premier League